Dundee Esplanade railway station served the city of Dundee, Scotland from 1889 to 1939 on the Tay Bridge Railway.

History 
The station opened on 1 May 1889 by the North British Railway, opening after the second Tay Bridge was built. On the eastbound platform was a signal box that has 'Tay Bridge North' on it, replacing the old one. This signal box closed in 1928. To the east were a group of sidings on the north and south sides of the station. The south set of sidings were later removed and the northern set were reduced to just two sidings. The station closed on 1 January 1917 but reopened on 1 February 1919, only to close again on 2 October 1939.

References 

Disused railway stations in Dundee
Railway stations in Great Britain opened in 1889
Railway stations in Great Britain closed in 1917
Railway stations in Great Britain opened in 1919
Railway stations in Great Britain closed in 1939
Former North British Railway stations
1889 establishments in Scotland
1939 disestablishments in Scotland